Eruvessi is a village in Irikkur Block Panchayat, Taliparamba Taluk, Kannur district in Kerala, India. It is located at a distance of around 50 Kilometers from Kannur. There is a famous temple called Padikkutti Devi temple and the festival or Utsav is well known. Eruvessi Sri Padikutty temple is the birthplace of Sree Muthappan. This place was ruled by Mannanar dynasty of Muthedath Aramana and Elayadath Aramana. The ruins of Aramana of the Mananar are still visible on the banks of Eruvessi River.

Demographics
As of 2011 Census, Eruvessi village had population of 19,216 which comprises 9,519 males and 9,697 females. The sex ratio of Eruvessy was 1,019 lower than state average of 1,084. Population of children in the age group 0-6 was 1,987 (10.3%) where 1,006 are males and 981 are females. Eruvessy had an overall literacy of 95.6% higher than state average of 94%. The male literacy stands at 97% and female literacy was 94.2%.

Transportation
The national highway passes through Taliparamba town.  Mangalore and Mumbai can be accessed on the northern side and Cochin and Thiruvananthapuram can be accessed on the southern side.  The road to the east connects to Mysore and Bangalore.   The nearest railway station is Kannur on Mangalore-Palakkad line. There is airport at Kannur.

Geography
Eruvessi is a hilly village on the eastern side of Kannur district.  The terrain is undulating in nature and the extreme eastern side has forests bordering Karnataka state.

References

Villages near Irikkur